The Australia Sevens is an international rugby sevens tournament that was first played in 1986. Currently hosted as the Sydney Sevens, the event is part of the World Rugby Sevens Series. The tournament was held in Brisbane, in Adelaide, and on the Gold Coast in previous seasons.

History
The NSW Rugby Union hosted an international sevens tournament at Concord Oval in Sydney from 1986 to 1988, as part of Australia's Bicentennial celebrations. The Australian Rugby Football Union, later the Australian Rugby Union (ARU) and now known as Rugby Australia, continued the event for a further year in 1989.

The 2000 Brisbane Sevens was the first Australian Sevens tournament in the World Sevens Series run by the International Rugby Board (IRB), now known as World Rugby. It was the 7th tournament of the series in the inaugural 1999-2000 season and was hosted at Lang Park. Fiji played Australia in the final, and won the match in the dying seconds, thanks to a brilliant try to Waisale Serevi. Brisbane's hosting rights for 2001 were withdrawn by the IRB because of the Australian Federal Government's sporting boycott of Fiji, imposed after the 2000 Fijian coup d'état. After sanctions were lifted later in 2001, the remaining two tournaments of Brisbane's four-year hosting agreement were played and won by Australia and England in 2002 and 2003 respectively. Australia was not awarded a World Sevens tournament for the next three years.

Adelaide secured the hosting rights for the 2006/07 season. The 2007 Adelaide Sevens took place in April of that year, replacing the Singapore Sevens in the calendar. The tournament was hosted at Adelaide Oval for five seasons, with the last edition of the Adelaide Sevens being held in 2011.

In April 2011, the ARU announced that the Australian leg of the Sevens World Series would be played at Skilled Park on the Gold Coast for at least the next four years. The tournament was scheduled for the early part of the 2011/12 season, which meant that two World Sevens events were played in Australia in 2011. The Gold Coast tournament was initially named the "International Rugby Sevens Gold Coast", but was later rebranded as the Gold Coast Sevens.

The Gold Coast attendances for the 2013 and 2014 events were lower than expected, and in March 2015 the ARU announced that Sydney would host the event for the next four years from the 2015–16 season.

With the closure and rebuilding of Sydney Football Stadium, both men's and women's events for the Sydney Sevens tournament were moved to Sydney Showground Stadium in 2019, and Western Sydney Stadium for 2020.

Results

Invitational tournament

World Rugby Sevens Series

Team records
Summary of results in the Australian leg of the World Rugby Sevens Series:

Updated to the 2023 tournament

Notes:

See also

 Australian Women's Sevens
 Rugby union in Australia

References

External links
 Official website
Adelaide IRB Sevens profile on UR7s.com

Australians get behind the Adelaide Sevens

 
Rugby sevens competitions in Australia
World Rugby Sevens Series tournaments
Recurring sporting events established in 1986
1986 establishments in Australia